Niurka Sodupe (born April 19, 1969) is a former professional tennis player from the United States.

Biography
Sodupe, the daughter of Cuban immigrants, went to Coral Gables Senior High School in Coral Gables, Florida.

At the age of 15, she was runner-up to Katerina Maleeva in the girls' singles final at the 1984 US Open. She competed in the juniors again at the US Open the following year and had a win over Mary Joe Fernández, but was unable to defend her title.

She made her WTA main draw debut as a wildcard at the 1985 Lynda Carter Maybelline Classic, a tournament in her home state, where she had a first round win over eighth seed Gigi Fernández.

Her career best ranking of 108 in the world was attained in the 1986 season.

In 1987 she made two WTA Tour quarter-finals, at the Puerto Rico Open and the Virginia Slims of Arkansas.

She is now the Director and Head Coach of Tennis Advantage of Miami.

References

External links
 
 

1969 births
Living people
American female tennis players
Tennis players from Miami
American sportspeople of Cuban descent
21st-century American women